Beverly Sue Ramos (born August 24, 1987) is a Puerto Rican runner. She competed in the 3000 metres steeplechase at the 2012 Summer Olympics, placing 35th with a time of 9:55.26. Ramos competed for Colegio Nuestra Senora de Belén. Ramos has trained in Manhattan, Kansas since 2007 where she was an All-American at Kansas State University. In 2021, she set the all-time record for the Maratón La Guadalupe de Ponce in Ponce, Puerto Rico.

Personal bests

Competition record

Marathons
2015 New York City Marathon: 15th (2:41:56) 2016 Rio standard

References

External links

K-State Biography

1987 births
Living people
Sportspeople from San Juan, Puerto Rico
Puerto Rican female steeplechase runners
Puerto Rican female marathon runners
Puerto Rican female long-distance runners
Olympic track and field athletes of Puerto Rico
Athletes (track and field) at the 2012 Summer Olympics
Athletes (track and field) at the 2016 Summer Olympics
Pan American Games competitors for Puerto Rico
Athletes (track and field) at the 2011 Pan American Games
Central American and Caribbean Games gold medalists for Puerto Rico
Competitors at the 2010 Central American and Caribbean Games
Competitors at the 2014 Central American and Caribbean Games
Competitors at the 2018 Central American and Caribbean Games
Central American and Caribbean Games medalists in athletics
20th-century Puerto Rican women
21st-century Puerto Rican women